WKEI (1450 AM) is a radio station broadcasting a news/talk format. Licensed to Kewanee, Illinois, United States, the station serves the Quad Cities area.  The station is currently owned by Fletcher M. Ford's Virden Broadcasting Corp.

WKEI is now a news/talk radio station, a Fox News affiliate and home to syndicated talk show hosts Joe Pags, Hugh Hewitt and Jim Bohannon.

References

External links

KEI
News and talk radio stations in the United States
Radio stations established in 1952